Division No. 19, also informally known as North East Manitoba, is a census division within the Province of Manitoba, Canada. Unlike in some other provinces, census divisions do not reflect the organization of local government in Manitoba. These areas exist solely for the purposes of statistical analysis and presentation; they have no government of their own. 

Division No. 19 actually extends all the way across the province from west to east at near its middle, although the overwhelming majority of its territory is located in its eastern and southeastern portions. It includes most of Lake Winnipeg, most of Lake Winnipegosis, and some of the north basin of Lake Manitoba.The Northern Region of Manitoba begins at the 53rd Parallel is known as Norman region denoting the start of Northern Manitoba.

The division had a population of 14,725 in 1996. The division had a population of 15,805 in the Canada 2001 Census.

Demographics 

Unincorporated communities
 Berens River
 Dauphin River
 Little Grand Rapids
 Pine Creek

First Nations Reserves
 Berens River 13
 Black River 9
 Bloodvein 12
 Chemawawin 3
 Crane River 51
 Dauphin River 48A
 Fairfield 50 (part)
 Fisher River 44 & 44A
 Fort Alexander 3
 Hollow Water 10
 Jackhead 43
 Little Grand Rapids 14
 The Narrows 49
 Misipawistik Cree Nation (Masikiskahk Indian Reserve)
 Pauingassi First Nation
 Peguis 1B
 Pine Creek 66A
 Poplar River 16
 Shoal River 65A
 Swan Lake 65C
 Waterhen 45

Unorganized areas
 Unorganized Division No. 19

References

External links
North East Manitoba census map
Map of Division No. 19, Manitoba at Statcan

19
Northern Region, Manitoba